Within molecular and cell biology, Reverse migration is the phenomena in which some neutrophils migrate away from the inflammation site, against the chemokine gradient, during inflammation resolution. The activation of in vivo inflammatory pathways (such as hypoxia-inducible factor, HIF), altered this behavior of reverse migration.

References

Cell biology
Immunology